Stanley Dangerfield (1911-1988) was a dog-show judge, active particularity in the United Kingdom, United States, but also working in dozens of other countries.

He started out owning Poodles and went on to also own Griffons Bruxellois. His most well known was Chosendale Seamus (breed by Desmond Gregory).

Career
Stanley Dangerfield wrote about dogs for the Daily Express and Sunday Express, and presented Crufts dog show on television for the BBC for 27 years, until retirement in 1981. He had a column in the newspaper for the dog world, Our Dogs. He was a critic of the Kennel Club.

He appeared as a castaway on the BBC Radio programme Desert Island Discs on 29 March 1975.

He died on 28 September 1988, shortly after having a stroke, aged 77.

Bibliography

References 

Place of birth missing
1988 deaths
Place of death missing
Dog shows and showing
Daily Express people
BBC people
1911 births